The Atatürk Mask is a large concrete bust of Mustafa Kemal Atatürk, founder of modern Turkey, located in Buca district of İzmir. The sculpture was completed in 2009 at a cost of ₺4.2 million.

History 
Buca Municipality has agreed with sculptor Harun Atalayman to have a monument dedicated to Mustafa Kemal Atatürk built. The sculpture, the construction of which started in 2006, was completed in 2009 at a cost of ₺4.2 million. In September 2010, a museum called the Independence War and 9 September Museum was established within the sculpture for a brief of time. In 2018, after being damaged by weather and climate, help was asked from trained mountain climbers with the repairs, because a crane is not able to access some locations of the monument.

Design 
It is built up over a scaffolding and not carved into the side of the mountain. To be more specific, the monument is steel structure containing a space truss system. In the lower left corner of the sculpture, Atatürk's quote "Peace at Home, Peace in the World" and his signature are embossed.

See also 
Mount Rushmore

References

External links 

Concrete sculptures in Turkey
Sculptures of men in Turkey
2009 sculptures
Monuments and memorials in İzmir
Monuments and memorials to Mustafa Kemal Atatürk in Turkey
Buca District
Colossal statues in Turkey
Mountain monuments and memorials
Busts (sculpture)